This is a list of seasons completed by the Princeton Tigers football team of the National Collegiate Athletic Association (NCAA) Division I Football Championship Subdivision (FCS). Since the team's creation in 1869 and competition in the first college football game, Princeton has played more than 1,200 officially sanctioned games, holding an all-time record of 852–411–50. Princeton originally competed as a football independent but joined the Ivy League as a founding member in 1956. The Tigers claim 28 national championships from official NCAA-designated major selectors and 12 Ivy conference championships.

Seasons

See also 
 List of Ivy League football standings

References

Princeton

Princeton Tigers football seasons